Samuel Herrick (April 14, 1779 – June 4, 1852) was a United States Representative from Ohio.

Born in Amenia, New York, Herrick pursued an academic course.  He studied law in Carlisle, Pennsylvania, was admitted to the bar in 1805 and commenced practice in St. Clairsville, Ohio.  He moved to Zanesville, Ohio, in 1810.  He was appointed prosecuting attorney of Guernsey County in 1810 and also United States district attorney.  In 1814 he was appointed prosecuting attorney of Licking County and commissioned brigadier general of the Ohio Militia.

Herrick was elected as a Democratic-Republican to the Fifteenth Congress and reelected to the Sixteenth Congress (March 4, 1817 – March 3, 1821).  He served as chairman of the Committee on Private Land Claims (Fifteenth Congress).

Herrick was not a candidate for reelection in 1820.  He continued the practice of law.  He served as presidential elector on the Jackson and Calhoun ticket in 1828.  He was appointed United States district attorney for Ohio in 1829 but resigned June 30, 1830.  He died in Zanesville, June 4, 1852, and was interred in City (now Greenwood) Cemetery.

Sources

1779 births
1852 deaths
Politicians from Zanesville, Ohio
United States Attorneys for the District of Ohio
Ohio lawyers
Ohio Jacksonians
19th-century American politicians
1828 United States presidential electors
County district attorneys in Ohio
American militia generals
Democratic-Republican Party members of the United States House of Representatives from Ohio